WOHA is a non-commercial educational FM radio station licensed to Ada, Ohio, operating at 94.9 MHz. The station is owned and operated by Holy Family Communications, Inc, and simulcasts Holy Family Radio, a Catholic radio station based at WJTA licensed in Glandorf and transmitting from Leipsic.

History
In 1988, Ohio Northern University applied to the Federal Communications Commission to build a new radio station in Ada. WONB began broadcasting October 18, 1991. It was a student-run station, with studios in the Freed Center for the Performing Arts and a transmitter on campus. The station played a classic hits format during the daytime and more contemporary hits at night. WONB was associated with the school's communication and media studies department and its multimedia journalism major.

In December 2019, Ohio Northern announced it was selling the WONB license and facility to Holy Family Communications, which would use the station to rebroadcast its Catholic radio station WJTA, licensed to Glandorf. The facility sold for $175,000. Holy Family had been attempting to expand into the Lima area for nearly a decade; in 2016, the network had lost out on a translator that was then bought by a commercial broadcaster and relocated to Cincinnati. Ohio Northern has shifted its student radio to a live stream and podcasts; it also did not sell the WONB call letters in the transaction.

The sale was consummated on April 21, 2020, at which time the new owners changed the station's call sign to WOHA (for "One Holy Apostolic"). Holy Family began operation of the station on April 22, 2020. Its 3,000 watt signal clearly reaches the greater Limaland area and its adjacent communities along the I-75 corridor of West Central and Northwestern Ohio, as far north as the agricultural communities north of Findlay and as far south as Anna and Botkins south of Wapakoneta in addition to the faith community and its pilgrims of the Basilica and National Shrine of Our Lady of Consolation located in the village of Carey and neighboring Upper Sandusky.

WOHA also audiostreams though the Holy Family Radio mobile app for cel phones.

References

External links
 Official Holy Family Radio website (with streaming audio)
 EWTN Global Catholic Radio
 Ave Maria Radio
 WONB The Beat (now a webcaster)
 

Lima, Ohio
1992 establishments in Ohio
Radio stations established in 1992
Catholic radio stations
OHA (FM)